The Empordà Challenge was a golf tournament on the Challenge Tour held at Empordà Golf on the Costa Brava near Girona, Spain.

In 2021, together with Challenge Costa Brava, also hosted at Empordà Golf, the tournament served as a replacement for the China Swing with Hainan Open and Foshan Open, which was cancelled.

In the inaugural tournament Jonathan Thomson took the early clubhouse lead, after posting a final round of 62 (−9). Jesper Svensson joined Brun at −18, but a bogey-bogey finish sent him to −16, and gave the victory to Julien Brun who held his nerve and finished −18, a stroke ahead of Thomson.

Winners

References

External links
Coverage on the Challenge Tour's official site

Former Challenge Tour events
Golf tournaments in Spain
Golf tournaments in Catalonia